Anjir in Iran may refer to:

Anjir, Iran, Ilam Province
Anjir, East Azerbaijan
Anjir, Hormozgan
Anjir, Razavi Khorasan
Anjir Mehi, Sistan and Baluchestan Province
Anjir-e Sigan
Anjir-e Ziraki